Petar Jokić (born 28 October 1985) is a Serbian football goalkeeper.

References

External links
 
 Petar Jokić stats at utakmica.rs

1985 births
Living people
Sportspeople from Zadar
Association football goalkeepers
Serbian footballers
FK Jagodina players
FK Timok players
FK Novi Pazar players
FK Mladi Radnik players
FK Sinđelić Niš players
FK Temnić players
Serbian SuperLiga players